Operations on the Ancre took place from  between the British Fifth Army and the German 1st Army, on the Somme front during the First World War. After the Battle of the Ancre (13–18 November 1916), British attacks on the Somme front stopped for the winter. Until early January 1917, both sides were reduced to surviving the rain, snow, fog, mud fields, waterlogged trenches and shell-holes. British preparations for the Battle of Arras, due in the spring of 1917, continued.

The Fifth Army was instructed by the commander in chief of the British Expeditionary Force (BEF), Field Marshal Sir Douglas Haig, to make systematic attacks to capture portions of the German defences to pin down German troops. Short advances could progressively uncover the remaining German positions in the Ancre valley to ground observation, threaten the German hold on the village of Serre to the north and bring German positions beyond into view. Artillery-fire could be directed with greater accuracy by ground observers and make German defences untenable.

A more ambitious plan for the spring was an attack into the salient that had formed north of Bapaume, during the Battle of the Somme in 1916. As soon as the ground dried, the attack was to be made northwards from the Ancre valley and southwards from the original front line near Arras further north, to meet at St Léger and combine with the offensive due at Arras.

On  the Germans withdrew another  on a  front. , the main German withdrawal from the Noyon salient south of the Somme, towards the Hindenburg Line, commenced on schedule on 16 March.

Background

German defences

By the end of 1916, the German defences on the south bank of the Ancre valley, had been pushed back from the original front line of 1 July 1916 and were based on the sites of fortified villages, connected by networks of trenches, most on reverse slopes sheltered from observation from the south and obscured from the north by convex slopes. On the north bank, the Germans still held most of the Beaumont-Hamel spur, beyond which to the north were the original front line defences, running west of Serre and then northwards to Gommecourt and Monchy-au-Bois. The Germans had built  (Reserve Position I), a double line of trenches and barbed-wire several miles further back from Essarts to Bucquoy, west of Achiet-le-Petit, Loupart Wood, south of Grévillers, west of Bapaume, Le Transloy to Sailly-Saillisel as a new second line of defence along the ridge north of the Ancre valley.

On the reverse slope of that ridge,  (Reserve Position II) ran from Ablainzevelle to west of Logeast Wood, west of Achiet-le-Grand, western outskirts of Bapaume, Rocquigny, Le Mesnil en Arrousaise to Vaux Wood. The 1st Army held the Somme front from the River Somme north to Gommecourt and had a similar number of troops to the British opposite, with ten divisions in reserve. On the night of  a German attack captured Hope Post near the Beaumont Hamel–Serre road, before being lost with another post on the night of

British positions

The right flank was held by IV Corps up to the north side of the Ancre river, with the XIII Corps on the north bank up to the boundary with the Third Army. II Corps and V Corps were in reserve resting, training and preparing to relieve the corps in line around  except for the divisional artilleries, which were to be joined by those of the relieving divisions.

An advance to close up to the Le Transloy–Loupart line, which ran from Essarts to Bucquoy, west of Achiet le Petit, Loupart Wood, south of Grévillers, west of Bapaume, Le Transloy to Sailly Saillisel, had been the first objective of British operations in the Ancre valley after the capture of Beaumont Hamel in late 1916. Operations began with an attack on 18 November, before the deterioration of the ground made operations impossible. Ground had been gained on a  front south of the Ancre and positions improved on Redan Ridge on the north bank. Over the winter, the Fifth Army submitted plans to General Headquarters (GHQ), which were settled in mid-February, after Joffre was replaced by General Robert Nivelle and the changes of strategy caused by the French decision to fight a decisive battle on the Aisne. The obvious difficulties of the Germans on the Ancre front, made it important to prevent the Germans from withdrawing to the new defences being built behind the Noyon salient (eventually known as the Hindenburg Line/) in their own time. A retirement could disrupt the British offensive at Arras and Franco-British planning gained urgency as a German withdrawal became likely in February and March, according to the results of air reconnaissance, agent reports and gleanings from prisoners.

Reaching a good position for an attack on the Bihucourt line which ran from Ablainzevelle to west of Logeast Wood, west of Achiet le Grand, western outskirts of Bapaume, Rocquigny, le Mesnil en Arrousaise to Vaux Wood, the Fifth Army objective was to be attacked three days before the Arras offensive and the army then to advance to St Léger, to meet the Third Army and trap the Germans in their positions south-west of Arras. The first stage was to be an attack on 17 February, in which II Corps was to capture  Gird Trench and the Butte de Warlencourt was to be captured by I Anzac Corps on 1 March and Serre was to be taken by V Corps on 7 March, which would then extend its right flank to the Ancre, to relieve the 63rd (Royal Naval) Division of II Corps and capture Miraumont by 10 March. These operations would lead to the attack on the Bihucourt line by II Corps and I Anzac Corps. These arrangements were maintained until 24 February, when German local withdrawals in the Ancre valley, required the Fifth Army divisions to make a general advance to regain contact.

Prelude

Winter

51st (Highland) Division

The state of the ground on the Somme front became much worse in November 1916, when constant rain fell and the ground which had been churned by shellfire since June, turned to deep mud again. (Some witnesses considered that the state of the ground was worse than at Ypres a year later.) The ground in the Ancre valley was in the worst condition, a wilderness of mud, flooded trenches, shell-hole posts, corpses and broken equipment, overlooked and vulnerable to sniping from German positions. Little could be done beyond holding the line and frequently relieving troops, who found the physical and mental strain almost unbearable. Supplies had to be moved up by soldiers at night, to avoid sniping by German infantry and artillery-fire. In January the weather slightly improved and on 14 January, the temperature fell enough to freeze the ground.

On the south side of the Ancre valley near Courcelette, the 51st (Highland) Division took over from the 4th Canadian Division on 27 November. The division had only just been relieved from the line on the north bank, after the Battle of the Ancre  with very little time for rest. Constant rain wet the ground so badly, that horses drowned and men became stuck up to their waists; in December ropes were issued to drag soldiers out of the mud. New trenches collapsed as they were dug and the front and support lines were held by shell-hole posts, which became islands of squalor. Duckboards and ration boxes used as platforms sank under the mud; cooking became impossible and movement in daylight suicidal. There were epidemics of dysentery, trench foot and frostbite; old wounds opened. Morale plummeted and moving about after dark led to working parties, runners, reliefs and ration parties getting lost and wandering around until exhausted. No man's land was not wired on this part of the front and British and German troops blundered into the wrong positions, Germans being taken prisoner on six occasions. Some dug-outs in Regina Trench were usable but conditions in the artillery lines were as bad as the front line, with ammunition being delivered by pack horse under German artillery fire. Larger shelters were dug into the sides of roads further back and only a minimal number of troops kept in the front zone.

After three weeks' work, positions in the front line had been improved and a frost hardened the ground, then a thaw made the ground worse than before. The 51st (Highland) Division stores obtained enough gumboots for an infantry brigade but many were lost in the mud as men struggled to get free. The division wore highland kilts, which left the top of the leg bare underneath and their boot edges chafed the skin and caused septic sores, until  of trousers were issued. Wearing the boots and standing for long periods made men's feet swell and walking became almost impossible. Buses were brought up to Pozières to collect soldiers as they straggled back from the front line during a relief. Quartermasters improvised large numbers of extra cookers, so that the troops in the line could eat hot food when they pleased but the improvements made little difference to sickness. The division began to relieve battalions after  with  rest before and after each period in the line. On 11 December, the divisional front was reduced to two battalions, with the front of each battalion area being held by a company and two Lewis-gun crews. Company strengths had declined to  so thinly spread that a stray German was taken prisoner near a brigade headquarters, having seen no sign of British troops until he was captured. In December and January, the division suffered  to enemy action, far fewer than those due to the weather and illness; the division was relieved by the 2nd Division on 12 January.

2nd Division
The front line consisted of  posts and support positions held by ten platoons, with nothing until three platoons in Courcelette and two companies nearby. Ironside Avenue, a communication trench, ran forward  towards the front line but was full of mud and impassable. Brushwood tracks, unusable during the day, continued the route towards the front line. Two battalions took over the front posts, with two more back towards Ovillers and La Boisselle, with the 15th (Scottish) Division on the right and the 18th (Eastern) Division on the left. The 2nd Division continued to consolidate the positions begun earlier, large working parties labouring non-stop to dig out, clean and pump trenches, fit duckboards and provide overhead cover for the infantry posts; tramways were built further back by engineers. Both sides were quiet during the rest of January, until the Germans attempted a raid which was stopped by machine-gun fire before the raiders had advanced past the German barbed wire; on the north side of the valley, British troops captured the rest of the Beaumont Hamel spur. By the end of the month conditions were better, although snowstorms covered the few landmarks and relieving parties frequently got lost. There was little artillery fire in the divisional areas but much German aircraft activity; British reconnaissance aircraft managed to photograph the front line on 29 January, giving the divisional commander the first accurate information about it. The freeze lasted for about five weeks until mid-February, which made movement of carrying-parties much easier as preparations to attack were being made.

7th Division
On the north bank of the Ancre the 7th Division returned to the line after a month of rest and reorganisation in Flanders. The trench ran north-west to south-east below the crest of Beaumont Hamel spur; Beaucourt Trench ran east from the south end of New Munich Trench. The British line was parallel to the German end of Munich Trench and Muck Trench. Conditions were worse if possible, than those on the south side of the Ancre valley, causing much sickness despite precautions like rubbing whale oil into the feet to prevent trench foot and bringing dry socks up with the rations. One battalion had  sick after a short period in the line. The temperature dropped several times in December, which began to harden the ground but this brought torrential rain, an even worse ordeal. Snipers caused many British casualties and on one trench relief, the mud was so bad that a special rescue-party had to be sent to dig out troops caught in the mud. Despite swift medical attention, a large number of men had to be taken to hospital and one soldier died of exposure.

The area was covered with trenches, many of which were derelict, damaged, half-built or obliterated by artillery-fire. Identifying the course of the front line or relating it to the map was impossible, as was the reconstruction of the front line, because trenches collapsed as soon as they were dug. Despite the conditions, New Munich Trench was extended to the north by the British and another  was dug to the south, in preparation for an attack on Munich Trench as soon as conditions allowed. At the end of December, there was a sudden increase in the number of German prisoners being taken, because a new German division had arrived, men got lost in the fog and stumbled into British positions and partly because of an unusual willingness to surrender. Twenty Germans were captured on 1 January,  2 January and another  were taken during the week, many of whom were deserters.

Raiding continued and on 1 January, two officers on the way to Hope Post with the rum ration met a German attack coming down Serre Trench and had to struggle back to Despair Post. A hurried counter-attack was defeated by German machine-gun fire and another attempt was postponed until the evening of 5 January. At  five hundred , two hundred  and two hundred and fifty  howitzer shells were fired at the post in fifteen minutes. At  fifty British troops attacked up Serre Trench and along the ground on either side as fast as they could through the mud, re-capturing the post, taking nine prisoners for one casualty. German artillery-fire was so severe that the British were forced out but were able to return after the bombardment and forestall German infantry, defending the post until they ran out of hand-grenades and withdrew; when a fresh supply of grenades arrived, the British took the post again and consolidated.

Trench raid, 4/5 February

Stokes mortars were to be used for bombardment but no artillery was to be fired before the raid; when it began the artillery was to fire a box barrage, to isolate the objective. White suits were provided in case of snow and all means of identification were to be removed by the raiders, who were told only to give name, rank and number if captured. That night the 1st Royal Berkshire battalion was relieved and went into reserve near La Boiselle.

Trenches resembling the target were found and used for five day and night rehearsals. The battalion commander made a reconnaissance and chose the jumping-off position. Three wooden tripods, painted black on the British side and white on the German, about  beyond the British wire identified the centre and flanks of the raiding route. Three more tripods had been placed  further on, to help the raiders keep direction. The Stokes mortars of the 99th Trench Mortar Battery opened fire, one mortar firing "rapid" at a particular German post at zero.

A minute later, the divisional artillery began the box-barrage, as the raiding party moved to within  of the objective and lay down. The first wave moved towards the east side of the salient, then from there to the western face, as the second wave jumped over the trench and ran along the parados, until they saw Germans in the trench near the apex. The raiders suffered one man killed and twelve wounded.

Operations: Ancre

11 January – 14 February
British operations at the end of the Battle of the Ancre in November 1916 had captured German positions on Beaumont Hamel spur and the village of Beaucourt, before the weather stopped operations. The attack began after an  bombardment and a standing barrage on the objective. Due to the state of the ground, the infantry advanced in three parties, with duckboards,  being allowed for the crossing  of no man's land. The objectives were consolidated and a German counter-attack was broken up by British artillery fire; a prisoner later said that a second one was cancelled; the 7th Division captured  for  The success covered the right flank of the 7th Division for the main attack next day against Munich Trench, from The Triangle to the Beaumont Hamel–Serre road and a smaller attack by the 11th (Northern) Division, against German defences east of Muck Trench. The operation failed when a German dugout was not noticed and overrun in the fog; its garrison emerged behind the British as other Germans counter-attacks from the front and pushed the British back to their start line.

A bombardment had been fired on the whole Fifth Army front for two days, particularly in the neighbourhood of Serre, to mislead the Germans. The attack by a brigade of the 7th Division began at  when the leading companies lined up on tapes,  from Munich Trench. V Corps took over from XIII Corps, with the 32nd and 19th (Western) divisions by 11 January, with II Corps on the south bank facing north, with the 2nd and 18th (Eastern) divisions. The 11th (Northern) Division stayed in the line, for another attack on the slope west of the Beaucourt–Puisieux road.

The bunker that had gone un-noticed in the previous attack was empty but German artillery caused many casualties and then a British bombardment stopped a German counter-attack as it was forming up at  the division was relieved on 20 January. For the rest of the month British troops sapped forward, linking the saps laterally until over the crest of Beaumont Hamel spur. Trench foot cases declined and small attacks became easier, although digging was almost impossible. The Fifth Army continued to redeploy troops, IV Corps moving to the southern boundary of the Fourth Army, to take over ground from the French Sixth Army; I Anzac Corps on the northern Fourth Army boundary, was transferred to the Fifth Army.

The 32nd Division, V Corps, advanced slightly near the Beaucourt–Puisieux road into unoccupied ground on 2 February and next day the 63rd (Royal Naval) Division tried a surprise attack on Puisieux and River trenches, which ran north from the Ancre west of Grandcourt, despite moonlight and snow on the ground. Two battalions advanced on a  front, another battalion guarding the left flank. Neighbouring divisional artilleries co-operated and a decoy barrage was fired near Pys, on the Fourth Army boundary. A German counter-attack on the right at  recaptured a post and at  a second attack was stopped by artillery fire. In the evening another battalion continued the attack and the Germans counter-attacked all night and recaptured several posts near the river. Grandcourt, on the south bank of the Ancre, had been made untenable and was abandoned overnight by the Germans overnight.

An attack on Baillescourt Farm was brought forward to 7 February and the 63rd (Royal Naval) Division captured the farm; south of Grandcourt, part of Folly Trench was taken by the 18th (Eastern) Division. On 11 February  a German counter-attack recaptured part of the trench before being forced out. On 13 February another German attack recaptured half of the trench, before two fresh British battalions drove them out again. The advance cost the British  the Germans suffered heavy casualties and  Each small British attack had succeeded; the captured ground secured a view over another part of the German defences and denied the defenders observation over British positions. The Fourth Army extended its front southwards to Genermont and the transfer of I Anzac Corps was completed on 15 February; the Fifth Army boundary being extended to the north of Gueudecourt.

Actions of Miraumont, 17–18 February

As a preliminary to capturing the Loupart Wood line, Gough intended the Fifth Army to continue the process of small advances in the Ancre valley. The occupation of  would command the southern approach to Miraumont and Pys, exposing German artillery positions behind Serre to ground observation, while attacks on the north bank took ground overlooking Miraumont from the west, possibly inducing the Germans to withdraw voluntarily and uncover Serre. II Corps planned to attack on 17 February with the 2nd, 18th (Eastern) and 63rd (Royal Naval) divisions, on a  front. The ground was too hard to dig assembly trenches, instead the troops assembled in the open.

The II Corps artillery began destructive and wire-cutting bombardments on 14 February, using ammunition with the new fuze 106 against the German wire, which proved effective, despite fog and mist making aiming and observation of the results difficult. At zero hour, four siege groups were to begin a bombardment of rear lines and machine-gun nests; four counter-battery groups were to neutralise German artillery within range of the attack. Other 18-pounders searched and swept the area (changed aim from side to side and back and forth) from the German trenches to  further back in succession, as the British infantry reached them. The rest of the 18-pounders fired standing barrages on each line of trenches until the creeping barrage arrived, then lifted with it. A protective barrage was formed beyond the objective according to a barrage timetable.

A thaw set in on 16 February and at dawn there were dark clouds overhead and mist on the ground, which turned soft, slippery then reverted to deep mud. The speed of the creeping barrage had been set for movement over hard going and was too fast for such conditions. At  German artillery bombarded the British attack front, apparently alerted by a captured document and a deserter. The British suffered many casualties as the infantry assembled but no retaliatory fire was opened, in the hope of lulling the German artillery. A subsidiary attack on the right by a battalion of the 2nd Division against Desire Support and Guard trenches, south of Pys, disappeared into the dark until  when it was reported that the attackers had been repulsed; British casualties and daylight made a resumption of the attack impossible. The effect of the failure on the right affected the operation further west by the 99th Brigade of the 2nd Division and the 54th and 53rd brigades of the 18th (Eastern) Division, which attacked the high ground from the right-hand of the two Courcelette–Miraumont roads to the Albert–Arras railway line in the Ancre valley.

The divisional boundary was west of the left-hand road from Courcelette to Miraumont, the 99th Brigade attacking on a  front between the two sunken roads. The 54th Brigade had a front which sloped steeply to the left and included Boom Ravine, with both brigades vulnerable to flanking fire from the right. The 53rd Brigade on the left flank had a wider front, much of which was also exposed to fire from the positions on the north bank due to be attacked by the 63rd (Royal Naval) Division and was to consolidate on the second objective.

Each brigade attacked with two battalions, the 99th Brigade with two companies to extend the defensive flank formed on the right with the subsidiary attack and  companies following on to leapfrog through to the final objective. In the 18th (Eastern) Division area, the 54th Brigade attacked with an extra company to capture dugouts up to Boom Ravine and consolidate the first objective as the 53rd Brigade formed a defensive flank on the left. Artillery support came from the divisional artillery, army field brigades and the neighbouring 1 Anzac Corps. The defenders were alert and inflicted many casualties with small-arms fire; the darkness, fog and the sea of mud slowed the advance and caused units to become disorganised. The 99th Brigade reached the first objective and established a defensive flank against German counter-attacks but the 54th Brigade found uncut wire at Grandcourt Trench and lost the barrage while looking for gaps. German troops emerged from cover and engaged the British infantry, holding them up on the right. The left-hand battalion found more gaps but had so many casualties that it was also held up. On the 53rd Brigade front, Grandcourt Trench was captured quickly but the advance was held up at Coffee Trench by more uncut wire.

The Germans in Boom Ravine were engaged from the flank and three machine-guns silenced before the advance in the centre could resume and parties found their way through the wire at Coffee Trench and captured it by  Boom Ravine held out until  and the advance resumed a long way behind the creeping barrage; the line outside Petit Miraumont was attacked. On the right flank, the 99th Brigade on the right flank advanced towards the second objective, much hampered by the fog and mud. The failure to maintain the defensive flank on the right left the Germans free to rake the brigade with machine-gun fire, causing more casualties. Some 99th Brigade troops briefly got into South Miraumont Trench and but were forced back to the first objective by German counter-pressure. German reinforcements counter-attacked from Petit Miraumont and the railway bank to the west. The weapons of many British troops had clogged with mud and they fell back, the troops on the right forming a defensive flank along West Miraumont road. Boom Ravine was captured but the Germans had held  and inflicted  British casualties,  the 6th Brigade,  the 99th Brigade, 2nd Division and  the 18th (Eastern) Division.

On the north bank, the 63rd (Royal Naval) Division attacked with a battalion of the 188th Brigade and two battalions of the 189th Brigade, to capture  of the road north from Baillescourt Farm towards Puisieux, to gain observation over Miraumont and form a defensive flank on the left flank back to the existing front line. Two battalions attacked with a third battalion ready on the right flank to reinforce them or to co-operate with the 18th (Eastern) Division between the Ancre and the Miraumont road. On the northern flank, two infantry companies, engineers and pioneers were placed to establish the defensive flank on the left. The divisional artillery and an army field brigade with fifty-four 18-pounder field guns and eighteen 4.5-inch howitzers provided fire support, with three field batteries from the 62nd (2nd West Riding) Division further north, to place a protective barrage along the northern flank. The darkness, fog and mud were as bad as on the south bank but the German defence was far less effective. The 63rd (Royal Naval) Division suffered  casualties and the three divisions took  prisoners.

The sudden thaw, fog and unexpected darkness interfered with wire cutting, slowed the infantry, who fell behind the barrage. The apparent betrayal of the attack forewarned the German defenders, who were able to contain it and inflict considerable casualties. Troops were ordered to edge forward during the next few days wherever German resistance was slight; the failure to capture  and persistent fog, left the British overlooked and unable accurately to bombard German positions. Further deliberate attacks intended on Crest Trench were made impossible by a downpour which began on 20 February. Edging forward continued in the 2nd Division area, which had gained  since 19 February. From 10 January to 22 February, the Germans had been pushed back  on a  front. The Action of Miraumont forced the Germans to begin their withdrawal from the Ancre valley before the scheduled retirement to the Hindenburg Line. At  on 24 February, reports arrived that the Germans had gone and by  patrols from the 2nd Australian Division on the right and the 2nd and 18th (Eastern) divisions in the centre and left, were advancing in a thick mist with no sign of German troops.

Operations: Somme

Minor operations

In January and February the Fourth Army began to relieve French troops south of Bouchavesnes. XV Corps took over the ground south to the Somme River on 22 January; III Corps moved south to Génermont on 13 February and IV Corps was transferred from the Fifth Army to relieve French forces south to the Amiens–Roye road. Despite the disruption of these moves, minor operations continued, to deceive the Germans that the Battle of the Somme was resuming. The attack had the support of creeping and standing barrages from ninety-six 18-pounder field guns, extended on either side by the neighbouring divisions and sixteen 4.5-inch howitzers, two 6-inch and one 9.2-inch howitzer batteries. A section of  howitzers was available for the bombardment of strong points and road junctions and the XIV Corps heavy batteries were able to neutralise German artillery during the attack.

A  length of Stormy Trench was attacked by part of a battalion of the 2nd Australian Division late on 1 February, which took the left-hand section and bombed down it to take the rest, before being forced out by a German counter-attack at  The Australians attacked again on the night of 4 February, with a battalion and an attached company, with more artillery support and a stock of  since the first attack had been defeated when they ran out. A German counter-attack was repulsed after a long bombing-fight, although the Australians had more casualties  than the earlier failed attack. On 8 February, a battalion of the 17th (Northern) Division attacked part of a trench overlooking Saillisel, after spending three weeks digging assembly trenches in the frozen ground. Artillery support was similar to that of the 29th Division attack and the objective was gained quickly, with troops wearing sandbags over their boots to grip the ice. German counter-attacks failed but a greater number of casualties was inflicted after the attack, mainly by German artillery fire over the next two days. British attacks on the Fourth Army front ceased until the end of the month.

The 8th Division conducted an attack on 4 March, which was prepared in great detail, a practice that had fallen into disuse in 1915, due to the dilution of skill and experience caused by the losses of 1914 and the rapid expansion of the army from 1915 to 1916. In February, instructions were issued from the divisional headquarters covering communications, supply dumps, equipment, arms and ammunition to be carried by each soldier, the proportion of the attacking units to be left out of battle, medical arrangements, substitute commanders, liaison, wire-cutting and bombardment arrangements of SOS signals for artillery and machine-gun barrages, gas bombardment, smoke screens and measures to deal with stragglers and prisoners. The instructions went into great detail, stipulating that officers were to dress the same as their men, precautions were to be taken to stop machine-gun barrages falling on friendly troops, the positions of observers and the calculation of safety distances. Signals to open fire were a green very light, a red and white rocket, a yellow and black flag or Morse SOS by signal lamp, at which the machine-gunners were to fire for ten minutes. The morale of British as well as German units had suffered and special arrangements were made to collect "stragglers" at brigade and divisional posts, where soldiers names were to be taken, before being rearmed and equipped with items taken from wounded troops in Advanced Dressing Stations.

The  (Malassise Spine), hog's-back (a long narrow-rested ridge with slopes of nearly equal steepness) overlooks Bouchavesnes and the Moislains valley towards Nurlu. The objective of the attack was to capture the north end of the spine to deny the Germans observation of the valley behind Bouchavesnes and the view towards Rancourt. The 25th Brigade on the right was to attack with one battalion on a  front and the 24th Brigade on the left was to attack with two battalions over an  front; mopping-up parties and carriers were provided by other battalions. No destructive bombardment on the objectives was fired, as it was intended to occupy them but wire cutting and the bombardment of strongpoints, trench junctions and machine-gun nests took place for several days before the attack. Machine-gun barrages to be fired over the heads of the attacking troops and on the flanks were arranged, with the divisional machine-gun unit and that of the 40th Division.

The freezing weather prevented the digging of assembly trenches again and the leading waves had to form up on lines of tapes, ready for the attack at  The troops were given chewing gum to stop them coughing, a slight mist aided concealment and a slight frost improved the going. The barrage began on time and after five minutes began to lift. The first objective at Pallas Trench was taken with few losses. At the junction of the attacking brigades, a small section which held out was quickly captured, before reverse-fire by the Germans there could stop the troops who had passed beyond. Pallas Trench was occupied by moppers-up and the attacking troops reached the second objective at  Trench on the right and Pallas Support Trench on the left. Some troops advanced so swiftly that they went beyond the objective to  Trench and captured a machine-gun before returning.

The defenders repulsed the attack at the Triangle; when it was eventually captured troops on the flanks were needed to reinforce the attackers, who had incurred many casualties. British arrangements for holding captured ground worked well and a German battalion preparing to counter-attack, from a wood near Moislains, was dispersed by the machine-gun barrage with  German troops overrun by the attack were captured or killed by mopping-up parties following the advanced troops. During the day, the Germans nearby counter-attacked five times over open ground but they were easily visible from  Trench and repulsed by small-arms fire. German attempts to bomb their way back up communication trenches were also defeated. German artillery-fire on the captured area, on the former no man's land and around Bouchavesnes caused considerably more casualties when two communications trenches were being dug to link the new positions with the old British front line.

German artillery-fire continued all day and at  German infantry seen massing on the right flank were dispersed by SOS artillery and machine-gun barrages before they could attack; German bombardments continued on 6 March, before slowly diminishing. The operation cost the British   prisoners and seven machine-guns were captured and "exceedingly heavy" German casualties inflicted, according to surveys of the vicinity after the German withdrawal to the Hindenburg Line. The new positions menaced the German defences at Péronne and the defences further south, which with the capture of Irles by the Fifth Army on 10 March, forced the Germans to commence their retirement towards the  two weeks early.

Air operations

The Royal Flying Corps undertook a considerable tactical reorganisation after the battle of the Somme, according to the principles incorporated in documents published between November 1916 and April 1917. During the winter on the Somme 1916–1917, the new organisation proved effective. On the few days of good flying weather, much air fighting took place, as German aircraft began to patrol the front line; of  aircraft shot down in December 1916,  were lost on the British side of the front line. German aircraft were most active on the Arras front to the north of the Somme, where  was based.

By January 1917 the German aerial resurgence had been contained by formation flying and the dispatch of Royal Naval Air Service (RNAS) pilots from Dunkirk flying the Sopwith Pup, which had a comparable performance to the best German aircraft; both sides also began to conduct routine night operations. Distant reconnaissance continued, despite the danger of interception by superior German aircraft, to observe the German fortification building behind the Somme and Arras fronts, which had been detected in November 1916. On 25 February, reconnaissance crews brought news of numerous fires burning behind the German front line, all the way back to the new fortifications. Next day 18 Squadron reported the formidable nature of the new line and the strengthening of German intermediate lines on the Somme front.

Aftermath

German withdrawals on the Ancre

British attacks in January 1917, had taken place against exhausted German troops holding poor defensive positions left over from the fighting in 1916; some troops had low morale and showed an unusual willingness to surrender. The withdrawal caused some surprise to the British, despite the interception of wireless messages from 20 to 21 February.

The second German withdrawal took place on 11 March, during a preparatory British bombardment; the British did not notice until the night of 12 March. Patrols found the line empty between Bapaume and Achiet le Petit and strongly held on either flank. German withdrawals on the Ancre spread south, beginning with a retirement from the salient around St Pierre Vaast Wood. On 16 March, the main German withdrawal to the  began.

Analysis

The British Official History and numerous other publications distinguish between local withdrawals, forced on the German 1st Army by British attacks on the Ancre in the new year against determined opposition and the main German withdrawal to the Hindenburg Line which was mainly protected by rear-guards, other historians treat them as part of the same operation. British operations on the Ancre took place during a period of considerable change in British methods and equipment. Over the winter, an increasing flow of weapons and munitions from British industry and overseas suppliers, was used to increase the number of Lewis guns to  battalion, a scale of one per platoon. A new infantry training manual that standardised the structure, equipment and methods of the infantry platoon was prepared over the winter and was published as  February 1917. The 8th Division attack at Bouchavesnes on 4 March, took place after the changes to the infantry platoon had been implemented, which provided them with the means to fight forward, in the absence of artillery support and under local command, as part of a much more structured all-arms attack than had been achieved in 1916.

The advance was still conducted in waves behind a creeping barrage, to ensure that the infantry arrived simultaneously at German trenches but the waves were composed of skirmish lines and columns of sections, often advancing in artillery formation, to allow them to deploy quickly when German resistance was encountered. Artillery formation covered a  frontage and  depth in a lozenge shape, the rifle section forward with the rifle bombers and bombing sections arranged behind on either side. The platoon headquarters followed, slightly in front of the Lewis gun section. Artillery was much more plentiful and efficient in 1917 and had been equipped with a local communications network, which led a corresponding devolution of authority and a much quicker response to changing circumstances. The success of the attack led to a set of the orders and instructions being sent to the US Command and Staff College to serve as models.

The organisation of artillery was revised according to a War Office pamphlet of January 1917, "Artillery Notes  in Offensive Operations", which put the artillery of each corps under one commander, established a Counter Bombardment Staff Officer, provided for the artillery of several divisions to be co-ordinated and laid down that artillery matters were to be considered from the beginning when planning an attack. The uses of equipment were standardised, the 18-pounder field gun was to be mainly used for barrages, bombardment of German infantry in the open, obstructing communications close to the front line, wire cutting, destroying breastworks and preventing the repair of defences, using high explosive (H. E.), Shrapnel shell and the new smoke shells. The QF 4.5-inch howitzer was to be used for neutralising German artillery with gas shells, bombarding weaker defences, blocking communication trenches, night barrages and wire-cutting on ground where field guns could not reach. The BL 60-pounder gun was to be used for longer-range barrages and counter-battery fire, the 6-inch gun for counter-battery fire, neutralisation-fire and wire-cutting using the No. 106 Fuze. The larger howitzers were reserved for counter-battery fire against well-protected German artillery and the larger guns for long-range fire against targets like road junctions, bridges and headquarters.

Co-ordination of artillery was improved by using more telephone exchanges, which put artillery observers in touch with more batteries. Observing stations were built to report to artillery headquarters located at corps headquarters, on the progress of infantry and a corps signals officer was appointed to oversee artillery communication, which had become much more elaborate. Visual signalling was used as a substitute for line communications and some short-range [] wireless transmitters were introduced. Weighing , needing four men to carry and considerable time to set up, the wireless proved of limited value. Artillery boards came into use, which had blank sheets with a  grid in place of maps, datum shooting was used to check gun accuracy from  a day and better calibration drills and meteor (weather) telegrams were announced. The tactical role of artillery was defined as, the overpowering of enemy artillery, the killing or incapacitating of enemy infantry and the destruction of defences and other obstacles to movement.

A barrage drill was devised, to prevent the opponent from manning his parapets and installing machine-guns, in time to meet the assault. Attacks were supported by creeping barrages, standing barrages covered an area for a period of time, back barrages were to cover exploitation by searching and sweeping ground, to catch troops and reinforcements while moving. One  for each  of barrage line was specified, to be decided at the corps artillery headquarters and creeping barrages should move at  a minute and stop  beyond an objective, to allow the infantry room to consolidate. Surplus guns were added the barrage, to be ready to engage unforeseen targets. A limit of four shells per minute was imposed on  guns, to retard barrel wear (before 1917 lack of ammunition had made barrel-wear a minor problem) and use of smoke shell was recommended, despite the small quantity available.

The experience of the Royal Flying Corps (RFC) in 1916, showed that single-engine fighters with superior performance could operate in pairs but where the aircraft were of inferior performance, formation flying was essential, even though fighting in the air split formations. By flying in formations made up of permanent sub-units of from  British squadrons gained the benefit of concentration and a measure of flexibility, the formations being made up of three units; extra formations could be added to be mutually supporting. Tactics were left to individual discretion but freelancing became less common. By the end of the Somme battle, it had become common for reconnaissance aircraft to operate in formation with escorts and for bomber formations to have a close escort of six F.E.2bs and a distant escort of six single-seat fighters. Trained observers gleaned information on German aircraft movements from wireless signals or ground observation and communicated the bearing from interception stations by wireless to wing headquarters or telephoned squadrons direct. Aircraft on patrol were directed to busy areas of the front by ground signals, although no attempt was made to control the interception of individual aircraft from the ground.

(Alberich Manoeuvre)

The severe cold ended in March and thaws turned the roads behind the British front into mudslides. German demolitions provided means to repair roads once the British advance began but traffic carrying the material did as much damage as the weather. Attempts to move artillery forward encountered severe delays. Ammunition had been moved forward in preference to road material in February and the German withdrawals in the Ancre valley, left the guns out of range. During the winter, many British draught horses had died of cold, overwork and lack of food, leaving the Fifth Army  short. The line of the road from Serre to Bucquoy, through Puisieux was almost impossible to trace but the 62nd and 19th divisions, on the flanks of the 7th Division of V Corps, fought its way into Puisieux on 27 February and began skirmishing towards Bucquoy by 2 March.

The 18th (Eastern) Division surrounded and swiftly captured Irles on 10 March and the 7th and 46th divisions were ordered to occupy Bucquoy on 14 March, after air reconnaissance reported it almost empty. Protests were made by Major-General George Barrow, the 7th Division commander, Brigadier-General H. Cumming, commander of the 91st Brigade, Major-General William Thwaites of the 46th (North Midland) Division and the commander of the 137th Brigade, after patrols had reported that the village was protected by many machine-guns and three belts of wire, despite two days of wire-cutting bombardments. The V Corps commander, Lieutenant-General Edward Fanshawe, insisted that the attack go ahead and agreed only a delay until moonrise at  The artillery bombardment was fired from  alerting the German defenders, who repulsed the attack. The 91st Brigade lost  and the 137th Brigade  the Germans withdrew two days later.

On 19 March, I Anzac Corps was ordered to advance on Lagnicourt and Noreuil, under the impression that the fires that could be seen foreshadowed a retirement beyond the Hindenburg Line. The 2nd Australian Division and the 5th Australian Division were past Bapaume, towards Beaumetz and Morchies and followed up the withdrawal of the 26th Reserve Division from Vaux-Vraucourt. Beaumetz was captured by 22 March and then lost during the night to a German counter-attack, which led the Australians to plan the capture of Doignies and Louveral with the 15th Brigade in daylight, without artillery or flank support. The plan was countermanded by the divisional commander, Major-General Talbot Hobbs, as soon as he heard of it and Brigadier-General Elliott was nearly sacked. The 7th Division commander, after the costly repulse at Bucquoy, delayed his  advance on Ecoust and Croisilles, to liaise with the 58th (2/1st London) Division to the north-west. Gough ordered the attack on Croisilles to begin without delay but the advance was stopped by the Germans at a belt of uncut wire on the outskirts of the village. Gough sacked Barrow and left his replacement, Major-General T. Shoubridge, in no doubt about the need for haste. The Hindenburg Line was unfinished on the Fifth Army front and a rapid advance through the German rearguards in the outpost villages, might make a British attack possible before the Germans were able to make the line "impregnable". The village eventually fell on 2 April, during a larger co-ordinated attack on a  front, by the I Anzac Corps on the right flank and the 7th and 21st divisions of V Corps on the left, after four days of bombardment and wire-cutting.

The British official historian, Cyril Falls, described the great difficulty in moving over devastated ground beyond the British front line. Carrying supplies and equipment over roads behind the original British front line was even worse, due to over-use, repeated freezing and thaws, the destruction of the roads beyond no man's land and demolitions behind the German front line. The British command was reluctant to risk unsupported forces against a German counter-attack and the evidence from the Fifth Army front, that hasty attacks became impractical once the Germans had begun the main retirement  led to a steady pursuit instead. The Australian official historian, Charles Bean, wrote that the advanced troops of I Anzac Corps had gone out on a limb, which had led to the reverse at Noreuil on 20 March, after instructions from the Fifth Army headquarters to press forward to the Hindenburg Line, were misinterpreted.

Advances were delayed as roads were rebuilt and more pack transport was organised, to carry supplies forward for larger attacks on the German outpost villages. In 1998, Walker contrasted the local withdrawals on the Ancre valley, where hasty but well organised British attacks had sometimes succeeded in ousting German garrisons. The determined German defence of outpost villages, after the rapid and scheduled part of the German retirement over  gained time to complete the remodelling of the Hindenburg Line, from south of Arras to St Quentin. The Fifth Army was far enough advanced by 8 April, to assist the Third Army attack at Arras on 9 April, having captured the outpost villages of Doignies, Louveral, Noreuil, Longatte, Ecoust St Mein, Croisilles and Hénin sur Cojeul on 2 April. On the right flank, Hermies, Demicourt and Boursies were captured by the 1st Australian Division on 8 April, after the Fourth Army took Havrincourt Wood on the right flank.

Notes

Footnotes

References

Books
 
 
 
 
 
 
 
 
 
 
 
 
 
 
 
 

Theses

Further reading

 
 
 
 
 
  url leads to orig ed.

External links

 Capture of Boom Ravine

Conflicts in 1917
Battles of the Western Front (World War I)
Campaigns and theatres of World War I
Battles of World War I involving Australia
Battles of World War I involving Canada
Battles of World War I involving France
Battles of World War I involving Germany
Battles of World War I involving New Zealand
Battles of World War I involving South Africa
Battles of World War I involving the United Kingdom
January 1917 events
February 1917 events
March 1917 events
1917 in France